Ikšķile (also known as Üxküll) is a town in Latvia, in Ogre Municipality. It was the first capital of the Roman Catholic Bishopric of Livonia, known by the German name of Üxküll. Saint Meinhard, known from the Livonian Chronicle of Henry, was the first bishop of Üxküll. In 1197 Berthold of Hanover, a Cistercian abbot of Loccum, was made the second bishop of Üxküll. Those days the town was the center of the upcoming crusading activities in the Livonian area. Bishop Berthold moved the episcopal see to Riga, but was killed by the Livs in battle.

The Livonian word Ikšķile (or the German Uexküll) denotes "the ford or islet(s), i.e. a place (on the Daugava River) where it was possible to cross the river, belonging to the son of the nobleman Ike”. The personal name Ike has the honourable meaning ‘age, lifetime’. The Ike family had a great power in Livonia. They controlled the military and trade traffic across the Daugava at Ykescola/Ykescole.

Other sources tell that the word Ikšķile (or the German Üxküll, Uexküll) comes from the meaning of (Finno-ugrian) Livonian word ükskül (yksikylä in Finnish). Ükskül (üks = one, kül = village) means simply just village number one, one village or The Village.

History 

Ikšķile is one of the oldest inhabited regions of Latvia. This is evidenced by the mound and an ancient burial ground in the present rural area of Ikšķile. By the 9th - 12th centuries there was already a Liv village on the Daugava waterway.

Latvia's First Castle 
Building and employment of castles was an important topic in the first accounts available in the Livonian Chronicle of Henry. Henry of Livonia, an eyewitness of the events, started telling about a canon of the Augustinian monastery of Segeburg in Holstein called Meinhard. Meinhard heard stories of travelers about the great Daugava river, an area of commerce for pagan tribes of Livs and Letts.

Meinhard venture there to convert people to Christianity. After some conversions, he built a church in the village of Ikšķile and baptized some Livonians. However, the position of the church was vulnerable to attacks, mainly from Lithuanian pagan inhabitants. After a Lithuanian raid attacked in winter, Meinhard and the local people hid in the forests. According to Henry of Livonia's chronicle, Meinhard pointed out that Livonians were foolish for not having fortifications, and promised people to built castles if they convert to Christianism.

In 1185 Gotland's stone-mounds built the castle of Ikšķile with a chapel or church. This is the oldest stone castle in Latvia and it is also the oldest stone building in Eastern Baltic. In 1186 the upper bishop of Bremen appointed the monk Meinard, of Segeberga monastery, near Lübeck, as the first bishop of Ikšķile. Under his leadership Ikšķile became the center from which Catholicism would spread in Latvia. Both Meinard and the second bishop, Bertolt, were buried inside Ikšķile Church (Bishop Meinard was later reburied at the Dome Church in Riga). Albert of Buxhovden followed to Berthold as bishop of Uexkull. He arrived at his diocese with a sizeable army of Saxon crusaders and supported by the Holy Roman Emperor and the Pope.

Moving of the Livonian Bishopric Center 
Albert realized that the diocese of Uexküll, defended by a castle with the same name, was far away from the Daugava river to be effective in the battle. For that reason, he requests another fortification near the sea, that would be the founding of Riga. In 1201, the third Bishop of Ikšķile, Albert, moved the Livonian Bishopric Center to Riga. During the Livonian Crusade Ikšķile Castle was attacked by the Semigallian troops on the left bank of the Daugava several times, and in 1203 and 1206  tried to capture the castle.

In 1638 the municipality of Ikšķile included eight manors, the richest of which being the Ikšķile and Tīnūžu manors. By the 19th century there were two manors left in the Ikšķile municipality, the Ikšķile and Berkava manors. After the formation of Ogre, which originally belonged to the Ikšķile municipality, the area of Ikšķile parish was gradually reduced.

The castle of Ikšķile was destroyed in the 17th century, and the church (which was rebuilt many times) was destroyed in 1916 by German artillery. In 1933 a new Lutheran church was erected near Ikšķile, near the station. Due to the construction of the Riga Hydroelectric Power Plant and the reservoir, the ruins of the first stone church were preserved in the 1970s; the island on which they are now located was increased and strengthened. The ruins of Ikšķile manor, as well as a castle, are below the water of the reservoir.

Government 
The head of the city government in Ikšķile is the mayor. The incumbent mayor Indulis Trapiņš.

Ikšķiles government is located at Ikšķile, Peldu street 22.

School 
Ikšķile Secondary School is a Latvian State School, founded in 1966. It is also a Junior Achievement Latvia School.

The origins of the Ikšķile School date back to 1864, when the first parish school was established under the leadership of Ikšķile. The school building is named Zemturi. About a hundred years after the development of Ikšķile School it was decided to build a new school. The building of the school took place near the center of Ikšķile, next to the new A6 highway. The Ikšķile School of the Ogre District was opened in 1966. The development and growth continued, therefore additional schools were built, enabling the establishment of a secondary school. From 1989 to 1990, the school was rebuilt, and in 1990 it was named the Ikšķile Secondary School.

Ikšķile library 
Ikšķile District Central Library is a library in Ikšķile, located on Peldu street 22.

The first library in the vicinity of Ikšķiles was formed and operational by the beginning of the 19th century. The first written information about the library of Ikšķile region can be found at the beginning of V. Villeruš's book "Gājums", which states that in 1852 a Reading Association with 35 members was established in the Ikšķile municipality. The library was restored in 1946, after the Second World War. There have been changes to the library over the years; in 1974, a separate children's library was created.

Popular places and objects 

 Ruins of the Ikšķile Church - the ruins of the oldest stone building in Latvia, located on a small islet, Sv. Meinard Island, artificially created in the Riga hydroelectric power station reservoir. Ikšķile Church was built in 1185 under the direction of Bishop Meinard. Rebuilt in 1879 - 1881, destroyed in 1916. After the flood of the Riga Hydroelectric Power Plant in the 1970s it has been surrounded by the reservoir waters. Today the ruins are preserved; a roof over them has been built, and the island is secured. Once a year, when the water level in the reservoir is lowered, it is possible to go to the church ruins on foot along the former road, which is lined by old tree trunks that have remained.
 Ikšķile Lutheran Church - Ikšķile, Kalēju street 1. Built in 1931 - 1933 by the architect Kundziņš. During the Soviet era, the church was used as a bookstore for the State Library of Latvia.
 Memorial stone - opposite the ruins of the old Ikšķile Church. The stone with the name "Ikšķile" in the Latvian, Liv, and German languages was installed in 1988.
 Ikšķile Spiritual Orthodox Church - Orthodox graves. Built in 1936.
 Artist J. Kuga's dwelling house - Ikšķile, J.Kugas street 11. In this house lived a Latvian artist and stage designer, LMA professor Janis Kuga (1868 Ikšķile Parish - 1969 Toronto, Canada). J. Kuga is the founder of stage painting in Latvia. The house is an architectural monument of local significance, and it is planned to arrange a museum inside of the building.
 Ikšķile Lutheran Cemetery - Ikšķile, Klusajā street. Inside the cemetery there is a monument dedicated to the Latvian riflemen who were killed in the First World War, installed in 1926, and two gravestones that are national monuments of art.
 Kapāmuru Brothers' Cemetery - Place of burial of the fallen Russian and German soldiers in the World War I in 1968. The monument was made by sculptor J. Karlova.
 Liepāderu brothers' cemetery - The soldiers who died in the Jugla battle of 1917 are buried here.
 Turbu grandstand - The girder's trunk circumference is over 7.1 m.
 Relziķu oak - trunk circumference 5.3 m.
 Kranciema juniper - trunk circumference 1 m.
 Ikšķiles open air stage - Cultural-historical place. Monument status from 2008.

See also
List of cities in Latvia

References

Source: William Urban, The Teutonic Knights, a Military History, (London 2003) 82,83.

External links 
 Ikšķile County - Official website
 Ikskile.com - Portal for Ikšķile region, inhabitants' resource
 Vietas.lv - Ikšķile in the guide of Latvia
 Iedzivotaji.lv - Ikšķile County Citizens' Association IEDZIVOTAJI

Towns in Latvia
Populated places established in 1992
Castles of the Teutonic Knights
Kreis Riga
Ogre Municipality
Vidzeme